Lily Yam Kwan Pui-ying  (Kwan; born 6 July 1946) is a former top Hong Kong civil servant.

Biography
Lily Kwan was born in Hong Kong in 1947, the fourth of six children. She attended Sacred Heart Canossian College until  1964, and later graduated from the University of Hong Kong in 1969 with a BA in English Language and Literature. After her marriage, she was known as Lily Yam. She joined the Hong Kong Government as an Administrative Officer upon her graduation in the same year. She has served in various departments and bureaux in her civil service career, including the ICAC, the Education and Manpower Branch of the Government Secretariat, the Civil Service Branch of the Government Secretariat, the Television and Entertainment Licensing Authority, the Central Policy Unit and the Secretariat for the Standing Commission on Civil Service Salaries and Conditions of Service.

Before taking up her appointment as the Commissioner for the Independent Commission Against Corruption in April 1997, she was Commissioner for Transport between 1995 and 1997. She headed the Environment and Food Bureau (which was later merged with the Health and Welfare Bureau to form the Health, Welfare and Food Bureau in 2002) between January 2000 and June 2002, when she retired. She was awarded the Gold Bauhinia Star (G.B.S.) in 2002 and appointed as Non-official Justices of the Peace in 2003.

Education
Yam graduated from the University of Hong Kong in 1969 obtaining a BA degree in English Language and Literature and a master's degree in Public Administration from Harvard University in 1984.

References

Mrs Anson Chan and her Core Group

Government officials of Hong Kong
1946 births
Living people
Alumni of the University of Hong Kong
Harvard Kennedy School alumni
Hong Kong women in politics
Recipients of the Gold Bauhinia Star
20th-century women politicians
21st-century women politicians